The cornea is a part of the eye. 

Cornea may also refer to:

 Cornea (surname)
 Cornea, a tributary of the Buda in Argeș County, Romania
 Cornea, Caraș-Severin, a commune in Caraș-Severin County, Romania
 Cornea (album), an album by Sywnthkrawft

See also 
 Cornel (disambiguation)
 Cornelia (disambiguation)
 Cornu (disambiguation)
 Corni (disambiguation)
 Cornetu (disambiguation)
 Cornățel (disambiguation)
 Cornești (disambiguation)
 Corneanu (disambiguation)